William  Welchman  (1866–1954)  was Archdeacon of Bristol  from 1927 to 1937.

Welchman was born in Cullompton
and educated at Queens' College, Cambridge. He was ordained after a period of study at Ridley Hall, Cambridge in 1891.  After a curacy at St Paul's, Leamington Spa he was a missionary  in Ceylon from 1892 to 1899. He was the Vicar of Fishponds, Bristol from 1901 to 1907; and of Temple Church in the same city until 1941.

He died on 7 March 1954.

References

1866 births
People from Cullompton
Alumni of Queens' College, Cambridge
Alumni of Ridley Hall, Cambridge
Archdeacons of Bristol
1954 deaths